Booraan is a railway siding at the  peg of the standard gauge Eastern Goldfields Railway between Northam and Kalgoorlie in Western Australia.

Geographically, Booraan is an unbounded locality within the Shire of Merredin, located between the towns of Merredin and Burracoppin.

It has been an identified rail accident location over time.

Military history
During World War II Booraan was the location of the No. 9 Advanced Ammunition sub-depot developed in 1942 and manned by 16 Ordnance Ammunition Section. It was closed in 1945.

References

Shire of Merredin
Railway sidings